Guanazomus is a monotypic genus of hubbardiid short-tailed whipscorpions, first described by Teruel and Armas in 2002. Its single species, Guanazomus armatus is distributed in Cuba.

References 

Schizomida genera
Monotypic arachnid genera